Kalejdoskopiska Aktiviteter (Kaleidoscopic Activities) is the first studio album by Swedish progressive rock band Qoph, released in 1998. The band recorded two versions of the album, one that was sung in English and the other in Swedish, but the English version was never released.'''One of the many jam sessions recorded during the studio work, the 18:31 minute long instrumental title song "Kalejdoskopiska Aktiviteter", with guesting keyboardist Joakim Svalberg (Opeth, Yngwie Malmsteen), was released as a bonus track on the double vinyl version.

Album information
The album cover was painted by legendary Swiss/Swedish surrealist artist Hans Arnold, who also did the cover for the 1976's ABBA album, Greatest Hits''.

Track listing

Personnel
 Robin Kvist - vocals
 Filip Norman - guitar
 Jimmy Wahlsteen - guitar
 Federico de Costa - drums
 Patrik Persson - bass

Guest musicians
 Karl Asp - saxophone, (on "Ta Farväl", "Aldrig Tillbaks" and "Förförande Rädsla")
 Ola de Freitas - violin, (on "Vansinnet")

Production
 Bo Fredrik Gunnarsson - engineer
 Marcus von Boisman - engineer
 Petter Ingman - engineer

Mastered by Claes Persson.

References

1998 debut albums
Qoph (band) albums